Senta Söneland (9 September 1882 – 20 July 1934) was a German stage and film actress.

Selected filmography
 The Canned Bride (1915)
 Benjamin the Timid (1916)
 The King of Paris (1930)
 The Copper (1930)
 Susanne Cleans Up (1930)
 Road to Rio (1931)
 Poor as a Church Mouse (1931)
 Die Bräutigamswitwe (1931)
 The Adventurer of Tunis (1931)
 My Heart Longs for Love (1931)
 Peace of Mind (1931)
 The Daredevil (1931)
 The Unknown Guest (1931)
 Scandal on Park Street (1932)
 The Secret of Johann Orth (1932)
 The Magic Top Hat (1932)
 Two Good Comrades (1933)
 Tell Me Who You Are (1933)
 North Pole, Ahoy (1934)

References

Bibliography
 Ball, Robert Hamilton. Shakespeare on Silent Film: A Strange Eventful History. Routledge, 2013.

External links

People from Thionville
1882 births
1934 deaths
German film actresses
German silent film actresses
20th-century German actresses
German stage actresses